The following events related to sociology occurred in the 1970s.

1970
Robert Adrey's Social Contract is published.
Jean Baudrillard's The Consumer Society: Myths and Structures is published.
Thomas R. Dye's and L. Harmon Zeigler's Irony of democracy is published.
Michel Foucault's The Order of Discourse is published.
Alvin Ward Gouldner's The Coming Crisis of Western Sociology is published.
Germaine Greer's The Female Eunuch is published.
Donald MacRae's New Society is published.
Nicos Poulantzas' Fascism and Dictatorship is published.
John Rex's Race relations in sociological theory is published.
Richard Sennett's Families Against the City: Middle Class Homes of Industrial Chicago, 1872-1890 is published.
Richard Titmuss' The Gift Relationship is published.

1971
Erving Goffman's Relations in Public is published.
György Lukács' History and Class Consciousness (last edition) is published.
Frank Parkin's Class Inequality and Political Order: Social Stratification in Capitalist and Communist Societies is published.
Talcott Parsons' The System of Modern Societies is published.
Frances Fox Piven's and Richard Cloward's Regulating the poor; the functions of public welfare is published.
Henry S. Shryock's and Jacob S. Siegel's The Methods and Materials of Demography is published.
William H. Sewell serves as president of the ASA.

Deaths
June 4 - György Lukács

1972
Stanley Cohen's Folk Devils and Moral Panics is published.
Andre Gunder Frank's Lumpenbourgeoisie: Lumpendevelopment is published.
Karl Popper's Objective Knowledge is published.
Michael Young's Is equality a dream is published.
William J. Goode serves as president of the ASA.

1973
Jean Baudrillard's The Mirror of Production is published.
Ernest Becker's The Denial of Death is published.
Daniel Bell's The Coming of Post-Industrial Society is published.
Raymond Boudon's Mathematical structures of social mobility is published.
James Coleman's The Mathematics of Collective Activity is published.
Shmuel Noah Eisenstadt's Traditional patrimonialism and modern neopatrimonialism is published.
Shmuel Noah Eisenstadt's Tradition, change, and modernity is published.
Alvin Ward Gouldner's For Sociology is published.
David V. Glass' Numbering the People is published.
Steven Goldberg's The Inevitability of Patriarchy is published.
Friedrich Hayek's Law, Legislation and Liberty is published.
Jacques Lacan's The Four Fundamental Concepts of Psychoanalysis is published.
John Rex's Discovering sociology : studies in sociological theory and method is published.
Peter Willmott's and Michael Young's Symmetrical family; a study of work and leisure in the London region is published.

1974
Raymond Boudon's Education, opportunity, and social inequality : changing prospects in Western society is published.
Harry Braverman's Labour and Monopoly Capital; the Degradation of Work in the Twentieth Century is published.
Oliver Cox's Jewish Self-Interest in Black Pluralism is published.
Erving Goffman's Frame Analysis is published.
Nicos Poulantzas' Classes in contemporary Capitalism is published.
Wilhelm Reich's The Sexual Revolution is published.
Immanuel Wallerstein's The Modern World-System (Volume 1): Capitalist Agriculture and the Origins of the European World-Economy in the Sixteenth Century is published.
Peter M. Blau serves as president of the ASA.
Last meeting of the London Positivist Society

Deaths
March 6 - Ernest Becker

1975
Randall Collins' Conflict Sociology is published.
Michel Foucault's Discipline and Punish is published.
Paul Feyerabend's Against Method is published.
Ian Hacking's The Emergence of Probability is published.
Ian Hacking's Why Does Language Matter to Philosophy? is published.
Charles Tilly's (ed.) The Formation of National States in Western Europe is published.
Nicos Poulantzas' Crisis of Dictatorships is published.
John Westergaard's and Henrietta Resler's Class in a capitalist society : a study of contemporary Britain is published.

1976
Jean Baudrillard's Symbolic exchange and Death is published.
Thomas R. Dye's Who's running America? : Institutional leadership in the United States is published.
Michel Foucault's The Will to Knowledge is published.
Anthony Giddens' The New Rules of the Sociological Method is published.
Morris Janowitz's Social Control and the Welfare State is published.
Edmund Leach's Culture and Communication is published.
Stuart Hall's and Tony Jefferson's (eds.) Resistance through Rituals is published.
Roy Wallis' The Road to Total Freedom is published.

1977

 Colin Crouch's Class conflict and the industrial relations crisis : compromise and corporatism in the policies of the British state is published.
 Frances Fox Piven's and Richard Cloward's Poor People's Movements: Why They Succeed, How They Fail is published.
 Michael Th. Greven's Parties and political rule: the interdependence of internal-party order and democracy in the FRG is published. Christopher Lasch's Haven in a Heartless World is published.
 Karl Polanyi's The Livelihood of Man is published.
 John Milton Yinger serves as president of the ASA.

Deaths

 March 26 - Will Herberg
 June 18 - Ali Shariati

1978
Arnaldo Bagnasco's, Marcello Messori's and Carlo Trigilia's Problematiche dello sviluppo italiano is published.
Paul Feyerabend's Science in a Free Society is published.
Ernest Gellner's State and Society in Soviet Thought is published.
Stuart Hall's, Charles Critcher's, Tony Jefferson's, Brian Robert's and John Clarke's Policing the Crisis is published.
Morris Janowitz's The Last Half-Century is published.
Nicos Panayiotou Mouzelis's Modern Greece Facets of Underdevelopment is published.
Nicos Poulantzas' State, Power and Socialism is published.
Amos H. Hawley serves as president of the ASA.

1979
Pierre Bourdieu's Distinction: A Social Critique of the Judgment of Taste is published.
Michael Burawoy's Manufacturing Consent is published.
Ralf Dahrendorf's Life Chances is published.
Reestablishment of Sociology in China.
Christopher Lasch's The Culture of Narcissism is published.
Jean-François Lyotard's The Postmodern Condition is published.
Michel Maffesoli's The Present Conquest is published.
Michel Maffesoli's Total Violence: Essay on Political Anthropology is published.
Theda Skocpol's States and Social Revolutions is published.
Viviana Zelizer's Morals and Markets: The Development of Life Insurance Policies in the United States'' is published.
Hubert M. Blalock, Jr. serves as president of the ASA.

References

Sociology timelines
Sociology